Miguel Ángel Barzola (born 14 May 1982) is an Argentine long-distance runner. At the 2012 Summer Olympics, he competed in the Men's marathon, finishing in 35th place.

References

External links
 
 
 
 

1982 births
Living people
Argentine male marathon runners
Olympic athletes of Argentina
Olympic male marathon runners
Athletes (track and field) at the 2012 Summer Olympics
Pan American Games competitors for Argentina
Athletes (track and field) at the 2019 Pan American Games